Our Lady of Lourdes Regional School, formerly Our Lady of Lourdes Regional High School, is a private, Roman Catholic high school in Edgewood Gardens, Coal Township, Pennsylvania.  It is located in the Roman Catholic Diocese of Harrisburg.

Background
Our Lady of Lourdes Regional High School was established as St. Edward High School in 1892, making it the oldest high school in the Diocese.  It was located in Shamokin.  The school was renamed Shamokin Central Catholic High School in 1955 when it became an inter-parochial high school, serving 9 parishes in the area.  The school moved to its present location in 1959 and was renamed Our Lady of Lourdes (OLOL).
In 2006–2007, Our Lady of Lourdes Regional High School incorporated the Shamokin diocesan elementary school Our Lady Queen of Peace. In the following year, the neighboring city of Mount Carmel, Pennsylvania's diocesan elementary school Holy Spirit became a part of the Lourdes' building.  These consolidations changed OLOL from a four year high school into a regional K-12 school and the school was renamed Our Lady of Lourdes Regional School.

Teacher firing 
Our Lady of Lourdes made the news when a teacher of four years was fired for admitting she was having a child with her boyfriend out of wedlock. Naiad Reich was told she was fired because she had no immediate plans to marry, Reich said she and her longtime boyfriend made the decision to start a family and planned the pregnancy. After informing administrator Sister Mary Anne Bednar she was terminated based on "immorality".

References

External links
 Our Lady of Lourdes Regional School
 

Roman Catholic Diocese of Harrisburg
Catholic secondary schools in Pennsylvania
Educational institutions established in 1959
Schools in Northumberland County, Pennsylvania
Private middle schools in Pennsylvania
Private elementary schools in Pennsylvania
1959 establishments in Pennsylvania